Scott Township is one of the twelve townships of Sandusky County, Ohio, United States.  As of the 2000 census, 1,502 people lived in the township.

Geography
Located in the southeastern corner of the county, it borders the following townships:
Madison Township - north
Washington Township - northeast corner
Jackson Township - east
Liberty Township, Seneca County - southeast corner
Jackson Township, Seneca County - south
Perry Township, Wood County - southwest corner
Montgomery Township, Wood County - west
Freedom Township, Wood County - northwest corner

No municipalities are located in Scott Township, however, the unincorporated community of Rollersville straddles the northern border with Madison Township.

Name and history
Scott Township was established in 1833. It was named for Merritt Scott, a pioneer settler.

Statewide, other Scott Townships are located in Adams, Brown, and Marion Counties.

Government
The township is governed by a three-member board of trustees, who are elected in November of odd-numbered years to a four-year term beginning on the following January 1. Two are elected in the year after the presidential election and one is elected in the year before it. There is also an elected township fiscal officer, who serves a four-year term beginning on April 1 of the year after the election, which is held in November of the year before the presidential election. Vacancies in the fiscal officership or on the board of trustees are filled by the remaining trustees.

References

External links
County website

Townships in Sandusky County, Ohio
Townships in Ohio